Magnhild is a Norwegian female given name.

People with that name include:
Magnhild of Fulltofta (died before 1228), Danish Roman Catholic local saint
Magnhild Eia (born 1960), Norwegian politician
Magnhild Haalke (1885–1984), Norwegian novelist
Magnhild Hagelia (1904–1996), Norwegian politician
Magnhild Holmberg (1943–2013), Norwegian politician
Magnhild Meltveit Kleppa (born 1948), Norwegian politician
Magnhild Lien, Norwegian mathematician
Magnhild Folkvord (born 1945), Norwegian journalist and biographer

Feminine given names